The Bangladesh National Cadet Corps (BNCC)  is a tri-services volunteer reserve force comprising the Army, Navy and Air Force for school, college and university students.

Students are trained by military staffs and personnel all through the cadet ship. BNCC remains high value on the public-military  relationship in the society.  BNCC cadets work together with Army, Navy, Air Force as well as Civil Defense authority in national integrity and emergencies.

History

After the establishment University of Dhaka (1921) the Corps initiated its activities under the provisions of the Indian Territorial Forces Act, 1923. Captain E. Groom was the first adjutant of the Corps. He imparted military training to 100 students and 16 teachers in November 1927. Later University Training Corps was officially founded in June 1928. In 1943, the name of the Corps was changed to University Officers Training Corps (UOTC). The members of this Corps took part in the liberation war of Bangladesh in 1971. After independence, Bangladesh Cadet Corps comprising college students, and Junior Cadet Corps comprising junior students, were formed in addition to University Officers Training Corps. On 23 March 1979, University Officers Training Corps, Bangladesh Cadet Corps and Junior Cadet Corps were all merged by President Ziaur Rahman. The organization is tri service combined from Bangladesh Army, Navy and Air Force. At present, its headquarters is located in Sector 6, Uttara, Dhaka. There are three categories of Cadets in BNCC and divided under two broad heads namely, Senior Division and Junior Division cadets. Senior division again has two categories of female and male cadets of various levels of academic qualifications. The Bangladesh Government Cabinet approved a proposal to bring BNCC under a legal framework and department. The proposal was titled Bangladesh National Cadet Corps Act-2015. The separate department would be under the Ministry of Defense. BNCC sent an delegation to India in a youth exchange program upon the invitation of the Indian Government and participated in Republic Day Camp 2009. The organization participates in Victory day parade.

Organization
Headed by a Director General who is also a Brigadier General of Bangladesh Army, Bangladesh National Cadet Corps has three wings: Army Wing, Air Wing and Naval Wing. Bangladesh National Cadet Corps (BNCC) is composed of 5 Army regiments (Army Wing), 3 Air Squadron (Air Force Wing) and 3 Naval Flotilla (Naval Wing). The regiments are: Ramna Regiment, Karnaphuli Regiment, Moinamati Regiment, Sundorbon Regiment, and Mohasthan Regiment. The Air Squadrons are: Number 1 Squadron, Number 2 Squadron and Number 3 Squadron. The Flotillas are: Dhaka Flotilla, Chittagong Flotilla and Khulna Flotilla. There are two entry points for the students to join as cadets, i.e., School and College / University. The senior division ranges from students of Intermediate colleges and extends up to universities. The cadet life lasts for both males and females up to four years. The junior division consists of cadets from class six.

Ranks

Cadets

BNCC Officers

List of Director Generals of BNCC

Training and activities

The Cadets receive military training. National Cadet Corps conducts its activities with the aim of providing military training to young people in order to develop them as a supporting force for military and providing a second line of defence. Its activities include basic military  training.

Other activities
Besides receiving military and other types of training, the cadets are also involved in social work. The cadets have participated in activities such as:

 Tree Plantation
 Blood donation
 Assisting fire fighters
 Disaster relief operation including rehabilitation
 Relief distribution
 Assisting in first aid, hygiene and sanitation etc.
 Security/volunteer at events in their respective educational institutions
 Community service
 Youth Exchange Program

See also
 Bangladesh Army
 Bangladesh Navy
 Bangladesh Air Force
 Bangladesh Military Academy
 Cadet Colleges
 Australian Defence Force Cadets
 Canadian Cadet Organizations
 Combined Cadet Force
 Junior Reserve Officers' Training Corps
 National Cadet Corps (Ghana)
 National Cadet Corps (India)
 National Cadet Corps (Singapore)
 National Cadet Corps (Sri Lanka)
 New Zealand Cadet Forces

References

External links
 Official website of BNCC
 Bangladesh Army
 Bangladesh Air Force
 Bangladesh Navy
 Daffodil International University BNCC Platoon

Military education and training in Bangladesh
Bangladesh Army
Bangladesh Navy
1979 establishments in Bangladesh
Bangladesh Air Force